Sogou Pinyin Method is a popular Chinese Pinyin input method editor developed by Sohu.com, Inc. under its search engine brand name, Sogou.

Sogou Pinyin is a dominant input software in China. By July 2011, Sogou Pinyin had an 83.6% penetration rate with more than 300 million users.

Features 
Sogou Pinyin provides features for customizing its dictionary, appearance and function. The dictionary of Sogou Pinyin can be enriched by adding so-called cell dictionaries, which contain words in special fields. The appearance of Sogou Pinyin can be changed using skins and animation. The function of Sogou Pinyin can be extended using extensions such as mouse-writing. Beside Pinyin input, it also includes stroke count method input.

Copyright conflict with Google Pinyin 
In April 2007, Sohu threatened to sue Google because after Google Pinyin's initial release, it was soon discovered that Google Pinyin's dictionary database contained employee names of Sogou Pinyin. On April 8, 2007, Google admitted that they used "non-Google database resources". Shortly thereafter, a new version of Google Pinyin was released which no longer appeared to be based on Sogou's database.

Sogou Cloud Pinyin
In 2009, Sogou launched a Bookmarklet named Sogou Cloud Pinyin that can allow any major browser to input Chinese characters on a webpage without installing any new software or plugins. It uses JavaScript and Ajax on the browser and apparently cloud computing technology on the servers.

See also
Google Pinyin 
Microsoft Pinyin IME

References

External links
 Sogou Pinyin Website
 Installation support and advice
 Sogou Cloud Pinyin Website 
 How to Input Chinese without Any Installation with Sogou Cloud Pinyin 

Han character input
Han pinyin input
Sohu